The Ministry of Health and Family Welfare, also known by its abbreviation MoHFW,is an Indian government ministry charged with health policy in India. It is also responsible for all government programs relating to family planning in India.

The Minister of Health and Family Welfare holds cabinet rank as a member of the Council of Ministers. The current minister is  Mansukh L. Mandaviya, while the current Minister of State for health (MOS: assistant to Minister i.e. currently assistant to Mansukh L. Mandaviya) is Dr Bharati Pawar .

Since 1955 the Ministry regularly publishes the Indian Pharmacopoeia through the Indian Pharmacopoeia Commission (IPC), an autonomous body for setting standards for drugs, pharmaceuticals and healthcare devices and technologies in India.

Organisation
The ministry is composed of two departments: Department of Health and Family Welfare and the Department of Health Research.

Department of Health
The Department of Health deals with health care, including awareness campaigns, immunisation campaigns, preventive medicine, and public health. Bodies under the administrative control of this department are:
 National AIDS Control Organisation (NACO) (see HIV/AIDS in India)
 14 National Health Programmes
 National AIDS Control Programme (AIDS) Department Of Aids Control (National AIDS Control Organisation) (Details About Aids)
 National Cancer Control Programme (cancer) (since 1985)
 National Filaria Control Programme (filariasis)
 National Iodine Deficiency Disorders Control Programme (iodine deficiency)
 National Leprosy Eradication Programme (leprosy)
 National Mental Health Programme (mental health)
 National Programme for Control of Blindness (blindness)
 National Programme for Prevention and Control of Deafness (deafness)
 National Tobacco Control Programme (tobacco control)
 National Vector Borne Disease Control Programme (NVBDCP) (vector-borne disease)
 Pilot Programme on Prevention and Control of Diabetes, CVD and Stroke (diabetes, cardiovascular disease, stroke)
 National Programme on Climate Change and Human Health (Cimate change)
 Revised National TB Control Programme (tuberculosis)
 Universal Immunisation Programme
 National Medical Commission
 Dental Council of India
 Pharmacy Council of India
 Indian Nursing Council
 All India Institute of Speech and Hearing (AIISH), Mysuru
 All India Institute of Physical Medicine and Rehabilitation (AIIPMR), Mumbai
 All India Institute of Hygiene and Public Health, Kolkata
 Food Safety and Standards Authority of India
 Central Drugs Standard Control Organization
 National Centre for Disease Control
 Help Us to help you COVID-19 pandemic

Department of Family Welfare
The Department of Family Welfare (FW) is responsible for aspects relating to family welfare, especially in reproductive health, maternal health, pediatrics, information, education and communications; cooperation with NGOs and international aid groups; and rural health services. The Department of Family Welfare is responsible for:
 18 Population Research Centres (PRCs) at six universities and six other institutions across 17 states
 National Institute of Health and Family Welfare (NIHFW), Delhi
 International Institute for Population Sciences (IIPS), Mumbai
 Central Drug Research Institute (CDRI), Lucknow
 Indian Council of Medical Research (ICMR), New Delhi

Department of Health Research 
The Department of Health Research (DHR) was created in 2007 and became functional the following month. Researches on estimation of disease burden, health related affordable innovative technologies process/product development, Translational research and child health care, are included in Grant-In-Aid Scheme of DHR.

Department of AYUSH
Department of Indian System of Medicine and Homeopathy (ISM&H) was established in 1995. It was later renamed as Department of Ayurveda, Yoga, and Naturopathy, Unani, Siddha and Homoeopathy (AYUSH)   in 2003. AYUSH focuses on research and education.

The Department of AYUSH no more falls under the Ministry of Health and Family Welfare, it was elevated to the Ministry of AYUSH with effect 9 November 2014.

List Of Ministers

List of Ministers of State

See also
 Mission Indradhanush
 Arogyavani
Integrated disease surveillance program (IDSP)
 Pradhan Mantri Digital Health Mission (PMDHM)
The Transplantation of Human Organs and Tissues Act (THOTA)
Traditional Knowledge Digital Library

References

External links
 Official website 
 Department of Ayurveda, Yoga & Naturopathy, Unani, Siddha and Homoeopathy (AYUSH), Official website
 National Health Portal (Available in English, Hindi, Gujarati, Bengali, Tamil and Punjabi)

 
Health and Family Welfare
Producers who won the Best Film on Family Welfare National Film Award